Paul Young (born 3 July 1944) is a Scottish television actor and presenter.

Young was born in Edinburgh, the son of the actor John Young. He was educated at George Heriot's School in Edinburgh.

He started acting as a child. His first performance was as Tiny Tim in the Edinburgh Gateway Company's production of A Christmas Carol in 1953, and he played the eponymous hero of the film Geordie in 1955. He played First Officer William Murdoch in the 1979 TV movie S. O. S. Titanic. Young also had a key supporting role in the Michael Winner made western Chato's Land (1972), which starred Charles Bronson, Jack Palance and Richard Basehart. Some of his later credits include The Tales of Para Handy, No Job for a Lady, Taggart, The Crow Road, Coronation Street and Still Game.

Young has gone on to find long-lasting fame among the fishing community, fronting a series of fishing TV shows, which began with "Hooked On Scotland" on the BBC in 1991. The show enjoyed somewhat unexpected success, winning a BAFTA for the first series. After two series, the show switched to ITV (Scottish TV), with the name changing to Hooked on Scottish and Paul's brief widening to include trips to fishing hot-spots around the world.

In 1999, Young was hooked by Scottish, and the show - with much the same format of Paul catching fish in many interesting places, each episode showcasing a different type of fish - was taken on by the Discovery Channel with the name changing again to "Hooked on Fishing". This ran successfully for six series up to 2004.

Young plays the character of Hugh "Shug" McLaughlin in Still Game, appearing occasionally in the early series but by series 5 and 6 becoming a regular cast member. Nicknamed "Shug the Lug" on the account of his distinctively large ears. Shug is generally the only pensioner that knows about gadgets and new technology in the group, owing to his service in the Royal Navy as a radio operator during World War II.

Young was involved in the lost Beatles interview, recorded in April 1964 at the Scottish Television studios, Cowcaddens, Glasgow. The reel of film was found in a rusting film can in South London.

Young played a Canadian character called Keith in a rather touristy short film of Irvine, Ayrshire made in the 1970s . It is available on YouTube by searching for " one day in Irvine"

Filmography

Film

Television

Radio

References

External links

1944 births
Living people
Scottish male television actors
Offshore radio broadcasters
Male actors from Edinburgh
People educated at George Heriot's School
Scottish television presenters
BBC television presenters
Scottish male child actors
Scottish male comedians
Scottish male film actors